Events during the year 1930 in Northern Ireland.

Incumbents
 Governor - 	 The Duke of Abercorn 
 Prime Minister - James Craig

Events
The Education (Northern Ireland) Act restores 50% government funding to Voluntary (chiefly Catholic) schools and allows religious instruction in controlled schools.

Sport

Football
International
1 February Northern Ireland 7 – 0 Wales (Joe Bambrick scored six of the goals)
22 February Scotland 3 – 1 Northern Ireland (in Glasgow)
20 October England 5 – 1 Northern Ireland (in Sheffield)

Irish League
Winners: Linfield

Irish Cup
Winners: Linfield 4 – 3 Ballymena United

Births
8 March – Douglas Hurd, seventh Secretary of State for Northern Ireland.
8 May – Heather Harper, operatic soprano (died 2019).
9 July – Hugh Morrow, footballer and manager
23 September – Colin Blakely, actor (died 1987).
Jim Anderson, loyalist paramilitary
Tomás Ó Canainn, electrical engineer and traditional musician (died 2013).

Deaths
1 October – James Whiteside McCay, Lieutenant General in the Australian Army, member of the Victorian and Australian Parliaments (born 1864).
May Crommelin, novelist and travel writer (born 1849/1850).

See also
1930 in Scotland
1930 in Wales

References